The Charyapada (IAST: Caryapāda, Assamese/Bengali: চর্যাপদ) is a collection of mystical poems, songs of realization in the Vajrayana tradition of Buddhism from the tantric tradition in Assam, Bengal, Bihar and Odisha.

It was written between the 8th and 12th centuries in an Abahatta that was the ancestor of the Assamese, Bengali, Bhojpuri, Odia, Magahi, Maithili, and many other Eastern Indo-Aryan languages, and it is said to be the oldest collection of verses written in those languages. Charyāpada written in the script resembles the most closest form of Bengali–Assamese languages used today. A palm-leaf manuscript of the Charyāpada was rediscovered in the early 20th century by Haraprasad Shastri at the Nepal Royal Court Library. The Charyapada was also preserved in the Tibetan Buddhist canon. 
As songs of realization, the Caryāpada were intended to be sung. These songs of realisation were spontaneously composed verses that expressed a practitioner's experience of the enlightened state. Miranda Shaw describes how songs of realization were an element of the ritual gathering of practitioners in a ganachakra:

Discovery 
The rediscovery of the Charyapada is credited to Haraprasad Shastri, a 19th-century Sanskrit scholar and historian of Bengali literature who, during his third visit to Nepal in 1907, chanced upon 50 verses at the Royal library of the Nepalese kings. Written on trimmed palm leaves of 12.8×0.9 inches in a language often referred to as sāndhyabhāṣa or twilight language, a semantic predecessor of modern Bengali, the collection came to be called Charyapada and also Charyagiti by some. At that time, Shastri was a librarian of the Asiatic Society in Calcutta, and was engaged in a self-assigned mission to trace and track ancient Bengali manuscripts. His first and second trips to Nepal in 1897 and 1898 met with some success, as he was able to collect a number of folkloric tales written in Pali and Sanskrit. However, after he rediscovered the treasure manuscripts in 1907, he published this collections in a single volume in 1916. According to some historians, there may very likely have been at least 51 original verses which were lost due to absence of proper preservation. Based on the original Tibetan translation, the book was originally called Charyagitikosh and had 100 verses. The scrolls discovered by Shastri contained selected verses.

Manuscripts
The original palm-leaf manuscript of the Charyapada, or Caryācaryāviniścaya, spanning 47 padas (verses) along with a Sanskrit commentary, was edited by Shastri and published from Bangiya Sahitya Parishad as a part of his Hajar Bacharer Purano Bangala Bhasay Bauddhagan O Doha (Buddhist Songs and Couplets) in 1916 under the name of Charyacharyavinishchayah. This manuscript is presently preserved at the National Archives of Nepal. Prabodhchandra Bagchi later published a manuscript of a Tibetan translation containing 50 verses.

The Tibetan translation provided additional information, including that the Sanskrit commentary in the manuscript, known as Charyagiti-koshavrtti, was written by Munidatta. It also mentions that the original text was translated by Shilachari and its commentary by Munidatta was translated by Chandrakirti or Kirtichandra.

Poets

The manuscript of the Charyapada discovered by Haraprasad Shastri from Nepal consists of 47 padas (verses). The title-page, the colophon, and pages 36, 37, 38, 39, and 66 (containing padas 24, 25, and 48 and their commentary) were missing in this manuscript. The 47 verses of this manuscript were composed by 22 of the Mahasiddhas (750 and 1150 CE), or Siddhacharyas, whose names are mentioned at the beginning of each pada (except the first pada). Some parts of the manuscripts are lost; however, in the Tibetan Buddhist Canon, a translation of 50 padas is found, which includes padas 24, 25, and 48, and the complete pada 23. Pada 25 was written by the Siddhacharya poet Tantripāda, whose work was previously missing. In his commentary on pada 10, Munidatta mentions the name of another Siddhacharya poet, Ladidombipāda, but no pada written by him has been discovered so far.

The names of the Siddhacharyas in Sanskrit (or its Tibetan language equivalent), and the raga in which the verse was to be sung, are mentioned prior to each pada. The Sanskrit names of the Siddhacharya poets were likely assigned to each pada by the commentator Munidatta. Modern scholars doubt whether these assignments are proper, on the basis of the internal evidences and other literary sources. Controversies also exist among scholars as to the original names of the Siddhacharyas.

The poets and their works as mentioned in the text are as follows:

Nature
The language of the Charyapada is rather symbolic in nature. So in many cases the literal meaning of a word does not make any sense. As a result, every poem has a descriptive or narrative surface meaning but also encodes tantric Buddhist teachings. Some experts believe this was to conceal sacred knowledge from the uninitiated, while others hold that it was to avoid religious persecution. Attempts have been made to decipher the secret tantric meanings of the Charyapada.

Period
Haraprasad Shastri, who rediscovered the Charyapada, conjectured that it was written during the 10th century. However, according to Suniti Kumar Chatterji, it was composed between 10th and 12th century. Prabodh Chandra Bagchi upholds this view. Sukumar Sen, while supporting this view, also states that the Charyapada could have been written between the 11th and 14th centuries. However, Muhammad Shahidullah was of the opinion that the Charyapada dates back to an even earlier time. He maintained that it was likely to have been composed between 7th and 11th century. Rahul Sankrityayan thought that the Charyapada was probably written between 8th and 11th century.

Language
Haraprasad Shastri, in his introduction to the Charyacharya-vinishchaya, referred to the enigmatic language of its verses as "twilight language" (Sanskrit: Sandhya-bhasha), or Alo-andhari  (half-expressed and half-concealed) based on the Sanskrit commentary of Munidatta. Vidhushekhara Shastri, on the basis of evidence from a number of Buddhist texts, later referred to this language as 'Intentional Language' (Sanskrit: Sandha-bhasha).

The padas were written by poets from different regions, and it is natural that they would display linguistic affinities from these regions. Different scholars have noted the affinities of the language of the Charyapada with Assamese, Odia, Bengali, and Maithili.

Affinities with Assamese
Luipa was from Kamarupa and wrote two charyas. Sarahapa, another poet, is said to have been from Rani, a place close to present-day Guwahati.  Some of the affinities with Assamese are:

Negatives – the negative particle in Assamese comes ahead of the verb: na jãi (No. 2, 15, 20, 29); na jivami (No. 4); na chadaa, na jani, na disaa (No. 6).  Charya 15 has 9 such forms.Present participles – the suffix -ante is used as in Assamese of the Vaishnava period: jvante (while living, No. 22); sunante (while listening, No. 30) etc.Incomplete verb forms – suffixes -i and -iya used in modern and Early Assamese respectively: kari (3, 38); cumbi (4); maria (11); laia (28) etc.Present indefinite verb forms – -ai: bhanai (1); tarai (5); pivai (6).Future – the -iva suffix: haiba (5); kariba (7).Nominative case ending – case ending in e: kumbhire khaa, core nila (2).Instrumental case ending – case ending -e and -era: uju bate gela (15); kuthare chijaa (45).

The vocabulary of the Charyapadas includes non-tatsama words which are typically Assamese, such as dala (1), thira kari (3, 38), tai (4), uju (15), caka (14) etc.

Affinities with Bengali
A large number of Siddhacharyas who wrote the verses of Charyapada were from Bengal.Shabarpa, Kukkuripa, Dipankar Srigyan and Bhusukupa were born in different parts of Bengal. Some of the affinities with Bengali are:

Genitive -era, -ara;Locative -te, -e/A;Nominative -Ta; Present participles – the suffix -ante and -anta is used in Middle Bengali; Present indefinite verb -ai that transformed into -e in modern Bangla;Second Person Suffix -asi/si that transformed into -is in modern Bangla; Incomplete verb forms of participles – suffixes -i and -iya used in modern poetry and Early and Middle Bangla both Post-positional words like majha, antara, sanga;Past and future bases -il-, -ib-;Nominative case ending – case ending in e is prevalent in many dialects in modern Bangla (even certain situations in standard Bangla) as well as middle Bangla;Instrumental case ending – case ending -e;Conjunctive indeclinable -ia;Conjunctive conditional -ite;Passive -ia-Substantive roots ach and thak.

Affinities with Odia
The beginnings of Odia poetry coincide with the development of Charya Sahitya, the literature thus started by Mahayana Buddhist poets.  This literature was written in a specific metaphor named "Sandhya Bhasha" and the poets like Luipa or Luipada,Kanhupa,Sarhapa, Kambalamara etc. are from the territory of Odisha. The language of Charya was considered as Prakrita and its closely related to Prakrit languages spoken in the Eastern parts of India and Odra Prakrit is one the oldest among other Prakrit language spoken in Eastern India. In his book (Ascharya Charyachaya) Karunakar Kar has mentioned that Odisha is the origin of Charyapada as the Vajrayana school of Buddhism evolved there and started female worship in Buddhism. Worship of Matri Dakini and the practice of "Kaya sadhana" are the outcome of such new culture. Buddhist scholars like "Lakshminkara" and "Padmasambhava" were born in Odisha. The ideas and experience of Kaya sadhana and Shaki upasana (worshiping female principle) which were created by Adi siddhas and have poetic expressions are found in the lyrics of Charyapada. These were the first ever found literary documentation of Prakrit and Apabhramsa which are the primitive form of languages of eastern Indian origin. The poets of Charyapada prominently are from this region and their thought and writing style has influenced the poems in medieval Odia literature which is evidently prominent in the 14th-16th  century Odia poetry written majorly in Panchasakha period.[23] The ragas used in Charjyapada, especially in the songs written by Mahasiddhas whose origin has been described in Odisha (as per traditional biographies), bear great affinity with ragas used in the traditional of Odissi music, starting from the Gitagovinda in the 12th century and classical Odia literature from the 14th to 19th centuries.

The language of Charya Sahitya and its relation to modern Odia language without any translation shows a continuity of the Odia linguistic traditions and an integral character of Classical tag for Odia language.

The language of Kanhupa's poetry bears a very strong resemblance to modern Odia. For example,

.
.
Paduma (Padma:Lotus), Chausathi (64), Pakhudi (petals) Tahin (there), Chadhi (climb/rise), nachaa (to dance), Dombi (an Odia female belonging to untouchable caste found in entire Odia speaking tract), Bapudi ( a very colloquial Odia language to apply as 'poor fellow' ).
. Haoila- Addres to women ,Puchhami – (will ask), Sadbhabe –(politely)
. Nagara-Town,Baahaare –(outside),Tohari-Yours,Kudia-Hut,so – se (he), jaha – jae (goes) etc.

.

Some of the writing in Jayadeva's Gitagovinda have "Ardhamagadhi padashrita giti" (poetry in Ardhamagadhi) that is influenced by Charyagiti.

Melodies
From the mention of the name of the Rāga (melody) for the each Pada at the beginning of it in the manuscript, it seems that these Padas were actually sung. All 50 Padas were set to the tunes of different Rāgas. The most common Rāga for Charyapada songs was Patamanjari.

While some of these Rāgas are extinct, the names of some of these Rāgas may actually be variant names of popular Rāgas we know today.

Glimpses of social life
Many poems provide a realistic picture of early medieval society in eastern India and Assam (e.g. Kamarupa, by describing different occupations such as hunters, fishermen, boatmen, and potters). Geographical locations, namely Banga and Kamarupa, are referred to in the poems. Two rivers which are named are the Ganga and Yamuna. River Padma is also referred to as a canal. No reference to agriculture is available. References to female prostitution occur as well. The boat was the main mode of transport. Some description of wedding ceremonies are also given.

Translations
Produced below is English translation of the first verse of the Charyapada. It was composed by Buddhist Siddhacharya poet Luipa.
The body is like the finest tree, with five branches.
Darkness enters the restless mind.
(Ka'a Tarubara Panchabee Dal, Chanchal Chi'e Paithe Kaal)

Strengthen the quantity of Great Bliss, says Luyi.
Learn from asking the Guru.

Why does one meditate?
Surely one dies of happiness or unhappiness.

Set aside binding and fastening in false hope.
Embrace the wings of the Void.

Luyi says: I have seen this in meditation
Inhalation and exhalation are seated on two stools.

Sarahapāda says :Sarah vonnoti bor sun gohali ki mo Duth Bolande
 Meaning-It is better than empty Byre than a naughty Cow

Bhusukupā says :Apona Mangshe Horina Boiri
Meaning-Deer is enemy itself by its meat
This piece has been translated into English by Hasna Jasimuddin Moudud.

Luipa and His Poetic Excellence 
Luipada is the first poet of the ' Charyapada', the first discovered and recognized manuscript of the Bangla literature. Luipa contributes two poems included in the first and twenty ninth among the 50 poems in the manuscript discovered by Horoprosad Shastri in 1907 from the Royal Library of Nepal. These poems are intended to sing, the reference of the name of Ragas with the pieces of the poems validates the supposition. The poems Luipa contributed are composed to sing on the raga ' Patmanjari'. This raga expresses sad and gloomy mood. A lover expresses his anguish being separated and sings as a form of soliloquy or to the close associates of him or her. This raga retains five notes ( SA, GA, MA, PA, and Flat NA) in the octave. This raga has been made popularized by N. Rajam who recorded a 30-minute soundtrack in 1997 under the title of 'Sounds of Strings' published by Living Media India. The melody excels its beauty in the dead of night.

Luipa like all other 24 songwriters in the manuscript did never expose the emotive aspect of human love, let alone the love to the Supreme Being. The physique is the world to them and their objectives were to reach a state of mind where they feel no biting of five senses. Luipa rather experiences his redemption at the point when he can stand up the beckon of sensuous pyre. The following poetic adaptation is a rendition of the translation of this poem by Muhammad Sahidullah. The thematic aspect of the poem for the modern reader who is alien to the Buddhist esoteric life goes:-  

:Five sensuous leaves a manly tree endows;

All they ripple by the slurs of tempted touch.

That Ashwata stands for its mighty roots unshaken;

Zephyrus is sure to defeat at that foot so beaten.

Is that thou stand out eternal;

Whence thou stooped at that sensuous pyre?

Let never epicurean buds sprout to beguile;

Let thou be hyacinths always sleek, so unshaken.

They know no bend flowing like a floral stream;

As redemption near at hand Lui, the bard, deems.

The second poem of Luipa reaches the supreme difficulty level of human existence. The existential crisis reveals through the poem, but the bard never loses the course of his expiation. Luipa confesses the world is existent; the human life has the color. Again; it is non-existent. The moonlight reflected in the waters is a true reflection of the existent moon; but the lightening water is not the light either. The poet here consoles himself with the realization that 'the world may be permanent or temporary; the poet never cares for delving into the truth; the poet realizes to lead a transcendental life'. The poem is translated thus-      

Where is it and where is it not that entity;

Who is here to be pleased with this duality?

The truth is really far to find

The feelings like senses can never bind.

That is non-perceived by colored forms and signs

The Vedas and Agamas trace only in blind.

The moon reflected in the water

Perceives as true even mirage for sure.

What is for me to think as astray;

The life I lead in transcendental gay?

Thus; the poet, Luipa, has created a poetical paradise that is beyond the reach of carnality.

The Feminine Exuberance in Kukkuripa 
Kukkuripa is referred to as having contributed with three buddhist songs- song 2, 20 and 48; songs 2 and 20 are found in the discovered manuscript and the song 48 was missing from the manuscript due to the broken pages.  In case of the two songs discovered with the contribution of "Kukkuripa", the Buddhist song maestro has addressed "Feminine ecstacy", and the activity of copulation at such a height that reeminds of the keen observation of a feminine experience re garding the relations in the family, a mother's urge to have a baby boy, a lady's urge to have communion with her husband; and the mad pursuit for sexual drive. The first poem of this Buddhist bard narrates the nightly drive of the daughter-in-law, " At midnight, the rag of the daughter-in-law has been taken by the thief. The father is awake at daytime. So, she cannot go out of the house at that time. But the night brings advantage to that lady and she strides out of the house for satiating her sexual drive as the father goes into deep sleep. The poetic presentation of this translation made by Dr. Muhammad Sahidullah aligns-

You can never suck to drain

Both of the breast milk-laden,

The enticing tamarind so sour in taste

How miracle does the alligator devour at a breath.

The yard with the home conjoins, hey piper,

The wife loses her ring at a nightly ride to a pilfer.

The slumber numbed the parent, but for the wife,

How she claims her ring lost for gaily ride!

The crow is feared in the sun by that maid,

Though she dares so savage a darkened quest.

So intriguing the song that Kukkuri sings,

Might it reach many, though learnt by one.(pp. 32–33).

When the translation [pp. 70–73] is gone through the phrases, 'I have a monk as my Husband, My sexual pleasure cannot be expressed. My first delivery is the boy' reminds the readers of the family perspectives a married woman has to undergo. Whatever mysticism, metaphor and allusion the poet wants to present in the guise of the family drama; the visual images reflect the inner picture of a married girl regarding her longing for the touch of the husband and the bliss with a baby boy.

The poetic adaptation of that translation of the Buddhist song of the Charyapada reflects-

The bottle empties to the lees

Exhausting by union with the clergy sexless.

Rising out of the womb that I saw

Hoped for other though I missed as an awe.

The boy that I wanted as a ma

So ill-fate the boy truly he has flaw.

My youthful passion killed the puberty off

The glittering glow drove the darkening shaft.

All the rivulets meet at the estuary

You know the axiom; you out of the aviary.

Both of the songs use allegory taken from the scenes of everyday sensual life. The Sexual drive is taken as an example to explain the 'Transcendentality' from the part of the monk who are engulfed with the esoteric livings.

References

Further reading 
 Charjapad Samiksha by Dr. Belal Hossain, Dhaka: Borno Bichitrra.
 Bangala Bhasar Itibrtta, by Dr. Muhammad Shahidullah, 1959, Dhaka.
 Dasgupta Sashibhusan, Obscure Religious Cults, Firma KLM, Calcutta, 1969, .
 Sen Sukumar, Charyageeti Padavali (in Bengali), Ananda Publishers, 1st edition, Kolkata, 1995, .
 Shastri Haraprasad (ed.), Hajar Bacharer Purano Bangala Bhasay Bauddhagan O Doha (in Bengali), Bangiya Sahitya Parishad, 3rd edition, Kolkata, 1413 Bangabda (2006).

External links 
 Caryāgītikoṣa (Fascimile Edition)
 Caryāgīti-koṣa of Buddhist Siddhas
 Old Bengali Texts (Caryāgīti)
 Les chants mystiques de Kāṇha et de Saraha
 Mystic Poems of Eighth Century India
 Milansagar

Bangladeshi poetry
Bengali poetry
Buddhist poetry
Pala Empire
Vajrayana
Assamese literature
Kamrupi culture
Odia literature